A showground is a places where events occur, including agricultural shows, and associated facilities. In Australia, New Zealand and the United States, showgrounds often house dirt track speedways.

Showground may refer to:

Australia
 Adelaide Showgrounds, in South Australia
 Ballarat Showgrounds, in Victoria
 Beaudesert Showgrounds, in Queensland
 Bendigo Showgrounds, in Victoria
 Boonah Showgrounds, in Queensland
 Claremont Showground, in Perth, Western Australia
 Fairfield Showground, in Sydney, New South Wales
 Geelong Showgrounds, in Victoria
 Kalbar Showgrounds, in Queensland
 Kiama Showground, in New South Wales
 Newcastle Showgrounds, in New South Wales
 Redcliffe Showgrounds, in Queensland
 RNA Showgrounds, in Brisbane, Queensland
 Royal Melbourne Showgrounds, in Victoria
 Royal Hobart Showground, in Tasmania
 Sydney Showground (Moore Park), in New South Wales
 Sydney Showground (Olympic Park) in New South Wales
 Sydney Showground Stadium, in New South Wales
 Sydney Showground Speedway, in New South Wales
 The Showgrounds, Wangaratta, in Victoria
 Traralgon Showgrounds, in Victoria
 Wollongong Showground, in New South Wales

Ireland
 RDS Showgrounds, in Dublin
 The Showgrounds (Sligo)

New Zealand
 Addington Showgrounds, in Christchurch
 Epsom Showgrounds, in Auckland
 Palmerston North Showgrounds

United Kingdom
 Agricultural Showgrounds, Frome, in England
 Ballymena Showgrounds, in Northern Ireland
 Balmoral Showgrounds, in Belfast, Northern Ireland
 East of England Showground, in Peterborough, England
 Great Yorkshire Showground, in Harrogate, England
 Kent Showground, in England
 Newark Showground, in England
 Royal Bath and West Showground, in Shepton Mallet, England
 Royal Highland Showground, in Scotland
 Shropshire Agricultural Showground, in England
 The Showgrounds (Coleraine), in Northern Ireland
 The Showgrounds (Limavady), in Northern Ireland
 The Showgrounds (Newry), in Northern Ireland
 Three Counties Showground, in Malvern, England
 South of England Showground, in Ardingly, Sussex 
Zimbabwe
 Showground, Bulawayo